Senator Hudson may refer to:

Charles Hudson (American politician) (1795–1881), Massachusetts State Senate
Douglas Hudson (1905–1983), New York State Senate
Thomas H. Hudson (born 1946), Louisiana State Senate